The 1989 CECAFA Cup was the 16th edition of the tournament. It was held in Kenya, and was won by Uganda. The matches were played between December 2–16.

Kenya sent two teams: Kenya A and Kenya B team.

Group A

Group B

Semi-finals

Third place match

Final

References
Rsssf archives

CECAFA Cup
International association football competitions hosted by Kenya
CECAFA